Mette Solli (born 14 September 1974) is a Norwegian kickboxer.

She was born in Molde. Her achievements include gold medal in light-contact at the W.A.K.O. World Championships 2001 (Maribor), a gold medal in full-contact at the W.A.K.O. European Championships 2004 (Budva), and a gold medal in full-contact at the W.A.K.O. World Championships 2007 (Coimbra).

References

1974 births
Living people
People from Molde
Norwegian female kickboxers
Sportspeople from Møre og Romsdal
21st-century Norwegian women